The graphics processing unit (GPU) codenamed the Radeon R600 is the foundation of the Radeon HD 2000/3000 series and the FireGL 2007 series video cards developed by ATI Technologies.

Architecture
This article is about all products under the brand "Radeon HD 3000 Series". All products of this series contain a GPU which implements TeraScale 1.

Video acceleration
The Unified Video Decoder (UVD) SIP core is present on the dies of the GPUs used in the HD 2400 and the HD 2600 but not of the HD 2900. The HD 2900 introduced the ability to decode video within the 3D engine. This approach also exonerates the CPU from doing these computations, but consumes considerably more electric current.

Desktop products

Radeon HD 3800
The Radeon HD 3800 series was based on the codenamed RV670 GPU, packed 666 million transistors on a 55 nm fabrication process and had a die size at 192 mm2, with the same 64 shader clusters as the R600 core, but the memory bus width was reduced to 256 bits.

The RV670 GPU is also the base of the FireStream 9170 stream processor, which uses the GPU to perform general purpose floating-point calculations which were done in the CPU previously.

The Radeon HD 3850 and 3870 became available mid-November 2007.

Radeon HD 3690/3830
The Radeon HD 3690, which was limited only to the Chinese market where it was named HD 3830, has the same core as the Radeon 3800 series but with only a 128-bit memory controller and 256 MiB of GDDR3 memory. All other hardware specifications are retained.

A further announcement was made that there would be a Radeon HD 3830 variant bearing the same features as Radeon HD 3690, but with a unique device ID that does not allow add-in card partners in China to re-enable the burnt-out portion of the GPU core for more memory bandwidth.

The Radeon HD 3690 was released early February 2008 for the Chinese market only.

Radeon HD 3870 X2

Radeon HD 3870 X2 (codenamed R680) was released on January 28, 2008, featuring 2 RV670 cores with a maximum of 1 GiB GDDR3 SDRAM, targeting the enthusiast market and replacing the Radeon HD 2900 XT. The processor achieved a peak single-precision floating point performance of 1.06 TFLOPS, being the world's first single-PCB graphics product breaking the 1 TFLOP mark.

Technically, this Radeon HD 3870 X2 can really be understood as a CrossFire of two HD 3870 on a single PCB. The card only integrates a PCI Express 1.1 bridge to connect the two GPUs. They communicate via a bidirectional bus that has 16 lines for a bandwidth of 2 x 4 Gb/s. This has no negative effect on performance.

Starting with the Catalyst 8.3 drivers, Amd/Ati officially supports CrossFireX technology for the 3800 series, which means that up to four GPUs can be used in a pair of Radeon HD 3870 X2.

AMD stated the possibility of supporting 4 Radeon HD 3870 X2 cards, allowing 8 GPUs to be used on several motherboards, including the MSI K9A2 Platinum and Intel D5400XS, because these motherboards have sufficient spaces between PCI-E slots for dual-slot cooler video cards, presumably as a combination of two separate hardware CrossFire setups with a software CrossFire setup bridging the two, but currently with no driver support.

Radeon HD 3600
The Radeon HD 3600 series was based on the codenamed RV635 GPU, packed 378 million transistors on 55 nm fabrication process, and had 128-bit memory bus width. The support for HDMI and D-sub ports is also achieved through separate dongles. Beside the DisplayPort implementations, there also exists other display output layouts as dual DVI port or DVI with D-sub display output layout.

The only variant, the Radeon HD 3650, was released on January 23, 2008 and has also an AGP slot with 64-bit bus width or the standard PCI-E slot with 128-bit.

Radeon HD 3400

The Radeon HD 3400 series was based on the codenamed RV620 GPU, packed 181 million transistors on a 55 nm fabrication process, and had 64-bit memory bus width. Products were available both as full height cards and as low-profile cards.

One of the notable features is that the Radeon HD 3400 series (including Mobility Radeon HD 3400 series) video cards support ATI Hybrid Graphics.

The Radeon HD 3450 and Radeon HD 3470 were released on January 23, 2008.

Mobile products

All Mobility Radeon HD 2000/3000 series share the same feature set support as their desktop counterparts, as well as the addition of the battery-conserving PowerPlay 7.0 features, which are augmented from the previous generation's PowerPlay 6.0.

The Mobility Radeon HD 2300 is a budget product which includes UVD in silica but lacks unified shader architecture and DirectX 10.0/SM 4.0 support, limiting support to DirectX 9.0c/SM 3.0 using the more traditional architecture of the previous generation. A high-end variant, the Mobility Radeon HD 2700, with higher core and memory frequencies than the Mobility Radeon HD 2600, was released in mid-December 2007.

The Mobility Radeon HD 2400 is offered in two model variants; the standard HD 2400 and the HD 2400 XT.

The Mobility Radeon HD 2600 is also available in the same two flavors; the plain HD 2600 and, at the top of the mobility lineup, the HD 2600 XT.

The half-generation update treatment had also applied to mobile products. Announced prior to CES 2008 was the Mobility Radeon HD 3000 series. Released in the first quarter of 2008, the Mobility Radeon HD 3000 series consisted of two families, the Mobility Radeon HD 3400 series and the Mobility Radeon HD 3600 series. The Mobility Radeon HD 3600 series also featured the industry's first implementation of on-board 128-bit GDDR4 memory.

About the time of late March to early April, 2008, AMD renewed the device ID list on its website  with the inclusion of Mobility Radeon HD 3850 X2 and Mobility Radeon HD 3870 X2 and their respective device IDs. Later in Spring IDF 2008 held in Shanghai, a development board of the Mobility Radeon HD 3870 X2 was demonstrated alongside a Centrino 2 platform demonstration system. The Mobility Radeon HD 3870 X2 was based on two M88 GPUs with the addition of a PCI Express switch chip on a single PCB. The demonstrated development board is on PCI Express 2.0 ×16 bus, while the final product is expected to be on AXIOM/MXM modules.

Radeon Feature Matrix

Graphics device drivers

AMD's proprietary graphics device driver "Catalyst" 

AMD Catalyst is being developed for Microsoft Windows and Linux. As of July 2014, other operating systems are not officially supported. This may be different for the AMD FirePro brand, which is based on identical hardware but features OpenGL-certified graphics device drivers.

AMD Catalyst supports of course all features advertised for the Radeon brand.

The Radeon HD 3000 series has been transitioned to legacy support, where drivers will be updated only to fix bugs instead of being optimized for new applications.

Free and open-source graphics device driver "Radeon" 

The free and open-source drivers are primarily developed on Linux and for Linux, but have been ported to other operating systems as well. Each driver is composed out of five parts:

 Linux kernel component DRM
 Linux kernel component KMS driver: basically the device driver for the display controller
 user-space component libDRM
 user-space component in Mesa 3D;
 a special and distinct 2D graphics device driver for X.Org Server, which is finally about to be replaced by Glamor

The free and open-source "Radeon" graphics driver supports most of the features implemented into the Radeon line of GPUs. They are not reverse engineered, but based on documentation released by AMD.

See also
 AMD FirePro
 FireStream 9170, the GPGPU version of Radeon HD 3870 graphics card
 List of AMD graphics processing units

References

External links
 ATI Radeon HD 2000 Series
 ATI Radeon HD 3000 Series
 ATI Mobility Radeon HD 2000 Series
 ATI Mobility Radeon HD 3000 Series
 techPowerUp! GPU Database

AMD graphics cards under ATI brand